Carceri is Italian for 'prisons'. It may refer to:

 Carceri d'Invenzione (Imaginary Prisons), a series of prints (1750–1761) by Piranesi
 Carceri, Veneto, a municipality in Padua, Italy
 Carceri (band), a Dutch death metal band
 Carceri (Dungeons & Dragons) or the Tarterian Depths of Carceri, a plane of existence in the Dungeons & Dragons game

See also
 Dalle Carceri, a noble family of Verona and Frankish Greece
 Carceri di Sant'Ansano, Siena, a church in Tuscany, Italy
 Carcieri v. Salazar, a 2009 U.S. court case about tribal lands
 Eremo delle Carceri, monastery in Umbria
 Santa Maria delle Carceri, Prato, a church in Prato, Tuscany, Italy